Time and Stars  is a collection of science fiction short stories by American writer Poul Anderson, published in 1964.

Contents
Source
 "No Truce with Kings": A war story set on a future, semi-primitive Earth with aliens
 Original Appearance: The Magazine of Fantasy and Science Fiction, June 1963
 "The Critique of Impure Reason": A robot will not work because it is infatuated with modern literature and literary criticism. (Not to be confused with the Critique of Impure Reason, a book in philosophy by Steven James Bartlett.)
 Original Appearance: If, November 1962
 "Escape from Orbit": Astronauts stranded in orbit around the moon
 Original Appearance: Amazing Stories, October 1962
 "Eve Times Four": Space traveler Lothario is stranded on a planet with three beautiful women
 Original Appearance: Fantastic Science Fiction Stories, April 1960
 "Turning Point": A first contact story that gives a haunting portrait of the price of giftedness and the loss of innocence
 Original Appearance: If, May 1963
 "Epilogue": A crew of humans return to Earth after a long absence, finding it has been taken over by a kind of transistor-based ecology of machines; a lack of understanding between the robots and the humans leads to tragedy
 Original Appearance: Analog, March 1962

Reception
Algis Budrys in the February 1965 issue of Galaxy Science Fiction said that "what Anderson needed in Time and Stars was an editor". He disliked "Eve Times Four" and "No Truce With Kings" but liked the others, calling "Escape From Orbit" "a beautifully done piece of work like nothing I have seen in the field before". In February 1966 Budrys named the book the best collection of his first year as reviewer for the magazine, and "Escape from Orbit" the best short story.

References

External links 
 
 

1964 short story collections
Science fiction short stories
Short story collections by Poul Anderson
Doubleday (publisher) books